Tokelau competed at the 2011 Pacific Games in Nouméa, New Caledonia between August 27 and September 10, 2011. As of June 28, 2011 Tokelau has listed 22 competitors.

Rugby Sevens

Tokelau qualified a men's team.  Each team can consist of a maximum of 12 athletes. They finished in 8th place.

Men
Lamese Pasene
Usi Seu
Lealofi Sasulu
Etuale Tehoa Ioane
Simona Puka
Kosetatino Liufau
Alosio Isaia
Elika Teao
Viliamu Ioapo
Luaao Luapo
Falima Tuumuli
Iona Koloi

Swimming

Tokelau has qualified 1 athlete.

Women
Dannielle Gaualofa

References

Pacific Games
Nations at the 2011 Pacific Games
Tokelau at the Pacific Games